Milred (died 774) (also recorded as Mildred and Hildred)  was an Anglo-Saxon prelate who served as Bishop of Worcester from  until his death in 774.

Life

Milred was consecrated between 743 and 745. He attended the major council of Clofesho in 747, and is found as a regular witness to charters of the Mercian kings Æthelbald and Offa. Milred is known to have travelled to Germany, where he met Boniface and Lull, in the early 750s. A letter from Milred to Lull written soon after his return, on the subject of Boniface's martyrdom shows that the writer was familiar with the works of Virgil and Horace.

A work by Milred, a compilation of epigrams and epigraphs on Anglo-Saxon churchmen, some of whom are known only from this work, is now lost apart from a single 10th-century copy of one page, held by the library of the University of Illinois at Urbana-Champaign. Antiquarian John Leland recorded some other parts of this work, which now survive only in his 16th-century copies.

Milred died in 774, and the event is recorded in the Anglo-Saxon Chronicle.

References

Bibliography
 Lapidge, M., "Milred", in Michael Lapidge et al., The Blackwell Encyclopedia of Anglo-Saxon England. Blackwell, 1999.

External links
 

Bishops of Worcester
774 deaths
8th-century English bishops
Year of birth unknown
8th-century Latin writers
8th-century English writers
Latin letter writers